The Prize (French: Le rosier de Madame Husson) is a 1950 French comedy film directed by Jean Boyer and starring Bourvil, Jacqueline Pagnol and Mireille Perrey. It is based on the 1887 novel Le Rosier de Madame Husson.  It was shot at the Saint-Maurice Studios in Paris and on location in Normandy including around Eure. The film's sets were designed by the art director Robert Giordani. It was a sizeable box office hit, being the seventh most popular film of the year in France.

Synopsis
A circle of a small town's older ladies decide to award a prize for virtue for a young woman with an unblemished reputation. When it turns out nobody in the settlement qualifies, they instead award it to Isidore an idiotic and bashful young man with a fear of the opposite sex. However when Isidore encounters and spends the night with a countess, who sits on the board giving out the prize, he is suddenly transformed into a worldly figure who returns to the town in triumph.

Cast
 Bourvil as 	Isidore Pastouret
 Jacqueline Pagnol as 	Élodie - la bergère / Young Girl
 Mireille Perrey as La comtesse de Blonville / Countess de Blonville
 Pauline Carton as Virginie Pastouret - l'épicière
 Henri Vilbert as 	Le brigadier / Brigadier of the Gendarmerie 
 Jeanne Véniat as 	Madame Pitard
 Albert Duvaleix as Le curé / Priest 
 Germaine Reuver as 	Nicoline - la fermière
 Jean Dunot as 	Polyte - le fermier
 Nina Myral as Madame de Gondreville
 Christian Lude as 	Le docteur Barbesol
 Yvette Etiévant as 	Marie
 Georges Baconnet as Fulgence Laboureur - le maire
 Suzanne Dehelly as 	Mdaemoiselle Irène Cadenat
 Germaine Dermoz as 	Madame Husson
 Fernand Blot as 	Un conseiller communal 
 André Dalibert as 	Célestin - un conseiller communal
 Marcelle Féry as 	Une cliente de l'épicerie Pastouret 
 Marcel Loche as Un conseiller communal
 Étienne Lorin as Le chef d'orchestre

References

Bibliography
 Goble, Alan. The Complete Index to Literary Sources in Film. Walter de Gruyter, 1999.
 Oscherwitz, Dayna & Higgins, MaryEllen. The A to Z of French Cinema. Scarecrow Press, 2009.

External links

1950 films
French comedy films
1950 comedy films
Films based on works by Guy de Maupassant
French black-and-white films
Films directed by Jean Boyer
1950s French films
Gaumont Film Company films
Films shot in Normandy
Films set in Normandy
1950s French-language films
Remakes of French films